Hughie Williams (3 September 1933 – 15 October 2017) was the former State Secretary of the Queensland Branch of the Transport Workers Union of Australia. He was State Secretary from 1992–2010 and was the national president in 2000. He was also State Secretary during the early 1980s and had been secretary of the now defunct Brisbane sub-branch throughout the 1980s.

Williams was a stalwart of the Union movement in his time as organiser and then Branch Secretary.

Williams dedicated his life to fighting injustices and was instrumental in the protests against the Springboks Tour in the 1970s.

On 10 December 2010 Williams stood aside as secretary after being defeated by a landslide defeat in the quadrennial elections by 'The New Transport Worker Team' headed by Peter Biagini.

Williams was raised in the coalmining area of Maitland in NSW. Williams has also competed at the 1964 Summer Olympics in wrestling  and was involved in organising for Brisbane's 1982 Commonwealth Games.

Williams died on 15 October 2017.

References

External links
Transport Workers' Union of Australia - Queensland Branch

1933 births
2017 deaths
Olympic wrestlers of Australia
Wrestlers at the 1964 Summer Olympics
Australian male sport wrestlers
Australian trade unionists